Aavahelukka Airfield  is an aerodrome located in Kolari, and partly in Muonio, Finland, about  north of Kolari municipal centre and  west of Äkäslompolo village.

Facilities

See also
 List of airports in Finland

References

External links 

  
 VFR Suomi/Finland – Aavahelukka Airfield
 Lentopaikat.net – Aavahelukka Airfield 

Airports in Finland
Kolari
Muonio
Buildings and structures in Lapland (Finland)